Jayson William Leutwiler (born 25 April 1989) is a professional soccer player who plays as a goalkeeper for National League club Oldham Athletic and the Canada national team.

A product of the FC Basel academy, he was loaned to several other clubs in Switzerland for the duration of his time there, before joining Middlesbrough in 2012. Rarely used at the Riverside Stadium, he was released two years later and joined Shrewsbury Town for free. He helped the team win promotion from League Two as runners-up in 2014–15. In August 2017, he joined Blackburn Rovers for an undisclosed fee. After making six league appearances in three years for the club, he moved to Fleetwood Town in September 2020, before joining Huddersfield Town in January 2021.

Leutwiler has been called up to represent Switzerland at youth international levels, up to under-21. He later transferred his national allegiance to Canada, receiving his first call-up to the national team in October 2016. He was chosen for their squads at the CONCACAF Gold Cup in 2017, 2019 and 2021.

Club career

Early career
Leutwiler started his youth soccer with the local club in Cornaux. In 2002, he moved to the youth system of Neuchâtel Xamax and stayed there until 2005.

Playing in the U-18 and U-21 teams, Leutwiler came through the ranks at FC Basel, but because Yann Sommer was first choice goalkeeper in front of him, Leutwiler was sent on loan at FC Concordia Basel in 2007, where he was more likely to get first-team action. At just 18 years of age he had much improving to do and a season-long loan spell at Concordia would have helped him to mature as a player. However, after only four games FC Basel cancelled the loan and took Leutwiler back as their first team third-choice goalkeeper because the transfer of Riccardo Meili fell through.

After two further seasons on the bench with the Basel first team squad and a number of appearances in the reserve team, Leutwiler was loaned out to Yverdon-Sport for the 2009–10 season. The following season, he was loaned to FC Wohlen, but he was unable to hold the first-choice goalkeeper position, so returned to Basel. During the second half of the 2010–11 and the first half of the 2011–12 season, he played for the Basel U-21 team again. On 27 January 2012, it was announced that he would be loaned out to FC Schaffhausen until the end of the season.

Middlesbrough
On 14 August 2012, it was announced that Leutwiler joined Middlesbrough.
He made his debut in a 3–1 win away at Preston North End in the League Cup third round on 25 September. It was his only appearance of the season; in addition he was an unused substitute for 42 Championship matches, 3 FA Cup games and 2 League Cup fixtures.

He made his league debut for the club on 10 August 2013, in a 1–0 win over Charlton Athletic at The Valley, replacing Jason Steele for the last 12 minutes shortly after Lukas Jutkiewicz had scored the only goal of the game. A week later, with Steele still injured, Leutwiler made his first league start at home against Blackpool. He conceded after 83 minutes from Chris Basham but Marvin Emnes scored an equaliser in added time. Leutwiler's third and final league appearance of the season came on 23 November, in Aitor Karanka's first match in charge, away to Leeds United: in the last minute of the first half, Steele was sent off for a foul on Dexter Blackstock and Leutwiler was brought on at the expense of Emnes in a 1–2 defeat.

Shrewsbury Town

Following his close season release from Middlesbrough, Leutwiler became the eighth summer signing to join Shrewsbury Town in League Two on a two-year deal on 11 June 2014. He started the season as first choice goalkeeper, keeping a clean sheet in each of the first three rounds of the League Cup, all against higher division opposition, to set up a fourth round home tie with Chelsea.

It was documented in February 2015 that Leutwiler had kept more clean sheets that season than any goalkeeper in Europe, 20 in 39 matches. Leutwiler broke the club record for most clean sheets in a league season, after keeping his 22nd clean sheet in a home match against York City, before clinching promotion to League One the following weekend with a 1–0 away victory at Cheltenham Town.

Leutwiler continued in his role as first-choice goalkeeper at Shrewsbury until a back injury ruled him out of a home match against Blackpool in September 2015, ending a run of 54 consecutive starts in the Football League, losing his place to Mark Halstead. He was immediately reinstated on his return to fitness, although he suffered concussion and facial injuries in a televised FA Cup second-round match at Grimsby Town in December which saw Halstead deputise for him once again. He returned to the side for an away match at Burton Albion, as Shrewsbury beat the league leaders 2–1.

With Shrewsbury avoiding relegation in their first season back in League One, Leutwiler signed a new contract in June 2016, keeping him at the club until summer 2018.

Blackburn Rovers 
On 2 August 2017, Blackburn Rovers announced the signing of Leutwiler on a two-year deal for an undisclosed fee. He was second-choice to the Spaniard David Raya and did not make his debut until 4 November in the first round of the FA Cup against Barnet; Blackburn won 3–1 at home and local newspaper the Lancashire Telegraph wrote that he was "left exposed for the Barnet goal but in truth had a relatively trouble-free Rovers debut". He played the remainder of their Cup campaign, a win over Crewe Alexandra on a replay, then a 1–0 loss to Hull City at Ewood Park in the third round on 6 January 2018. Leutwiler's league debut for Rovers was his only such appearance of the season, a 1–0 loss at Charlton Athletic on 28 April.

Fleetwood Town
Leutwiler joined League One club Fleetwood Town on 11 September 2020. He departed the club on 8 January 2021, following the expiration of his contract.

Huddersfield Town
On 1 February 2021, Leutwiler joined Championship side Huddersfield Town on a deal until the end of the season.

Oldham Athletic
In June 2021, Leutwiler joined Oldham Athletic, signing a two-year deal.

International career

Switzerland 
Leutwiler played twice for the Swiss U-16 team, his debut being in the 2–1 home win against the Czech Republic U-16 team on 26 April 2005. He also played for the Switzerland U-18 team on 18 October 2006 in the 4–5 away defeat against Slovakia U-18. Leutwiler was nominated for the Swiss national U-20 squad four times, playing three times. He gave his debut on 10 September 2008 in the 5–2 home win against Italy U-20 in the Stadio Giuseppe Sinigaglia in Como. His last appearance was against the same opposition on 20 May 2010 as the Swiss lost 4–1. He was also called up for the Swiss U-21 team, but remained on the bench in all three occasions.

Canada 
In August 2015, it was revealed that Leutwiller holds Canadian citizenship and would be interested in playing for Canada should the Canadian Soccer Association approach him. In October 2016, the CSA confirmed that he would take part in a Canadian camp. He made his debut as a half-time substitute against South Korea on 11 November 2016. Leutwiler was named to Canada's 40-man provisional team for the 2017 CONCACAF Gold Cup in June 2017, as well as the final 23-man squad. He was also named to the 2019 CONCACAF Gold Cup squad on 30 May 2019. On 1 July 2021 Leutwiler was named to the squad for the 2021 CONCACAF Gold Cup, his third participation at the tournament.

Career statistics

Honours

Club 
Basel
 Swiss Champion at U-18 level: 2005–06
 Swiss Cup Winner at U-19/U-18 level: 2005–06

Shrewsbury Town
League Two runner-up, second-place promotion: 2014–15

Blackburn Rovers
League One runner-up, second place promotion: 2017–18

References

External links

 

 Profile at FC Basel 
 Profile at Swiss Football League Website 

1989 births
Living people
People from Neuchâtel
Association football goalkeepers
Swiss people of Canadian descent
Canadian people of Swiss descent
Canadian soccer players
Canadian expatriate soccer players
Swiss men's footballers
Swiss expatriate footballers
Swiss expatriate sportspeople in England
Expatriate footballers in England
Neuchâtel Xamax FCS players
FC Basel players
FC Concordia Basel players
Yverdon-Sport FC players
FC Wohlen players
FC Schaffhausen players
Middlesbrough F.C. players
Shrewsbury Town F.C. players
Blackburn Rovers F.C. players
Fleetwood Town F.C. players
Huddersfield Town A.F.C. players
Oldham Athletic A.F.C. players
Swiss Challenge League players
English Football League players
Switzerland youth international footballers
Switzerland under-21 international footballers
Canada men's international soccer players
2017 CONCACAF Gold Cup players
2019 CONCACAF Gold Cup players
2021 CONCACAF Gold Cup players
Canadian expatriate sportspeople in England
Sportspeople from the canton of Neuchâtel